Hibbler is a surname. Notable people with the surname include:

Al Hibbler (1915–2001), American baritone vocalist
William J. Hibbler (1946–2012), American judge